The athletics competition in the 1930 Central American and Caribbean Games were held in Havana, Cuba.

Medal summary

Men's events

Medal table

References

 
 

Athletics at the Central American and Caribbean Games
Central American and Caribbean Games
1930 in Cuba
1930 Central American and Caribbean Games
1930s in Havana